Kulikovo is a rural locality (a settlement) and the administrative center of Kulikovskoye Rural Settlement of Krasnoborsky District, Arkhangelsk Oblast, Russia. The population was 679 as of 2010. There are 14 streets.

Geography 
Kulikovo is located on the Uftyuga River, 58 km northeast of Krasnoborsk (the district's administrative centre) by road. Omutinskaya is the nearest rural locality.

References 

Rural localities in Krasnoborsky District